Neukirch-Egnach railway station is a railway station in Egnach, in the Swiss canton of Thurgau. It is an intermediate stop on the Bodensee–Toggenburg line and is served by local trains only.

Services 
Neukirch-Egnach is served by the S1 of the St. Gallen S-Bahn:

 : half-hourly service between Schaffhausen and Wil via St. Gallen.

References

External links 
 
 

Railway stations in the canton of Thurgau
Südostbahn stations